The discography of American rock band Interpol consists of seven studio albums, seven extended plays (EPs), and fifteen singles. Interpol was formed in 1997 by New York University students Daniel Kessler and Greg Drudy, with Carlos Dengler and Paul Banks joining later. Drudy left the band in 2000, and was replaced with Sam Fogarino.

Following a self-released demo tape in 1998, the quartet's official debut was Fukd ID #3 in 2000, an EP distributed through Scottish independent record label Chemikal Underground. The label later announced that the EP had sold out. The band then self-published their Precipitate EP in 2001, and the strength of the previous two EPs led to the band signing with Matador Records on April 26, 2002.

Interpol's first release for the label was the self-titled Interpol EP in June 2002. The EP was considered a success by music critics, and aided in shedding the band's frequent comparisons to British post-punk group Joy Division. Two of the three tracks on the EP featured on the band's debut studio album, Turn on the Bright Lights, released in 2002. The record peaked at number 101 on the UK Albums Chart, and number 158 on the Billboard 200. The album was certified Gold in the United Kingdom, with the record's highest-charting single "Obstacle 1" reaching number 41 on the UK Singles Chart. After two years, the band released Antics in 2004. The album debuted at number fifteen in the US, and in the top ten on the Irish Albums Chart. The album's second single "Evil" peaked at number eighteen in the UK Singles Chart, the band's highest-charting single in the country. Antics was certified Gold in the United Kingdom, Australia and the United States.

In 2006, Interpol left Matador to sign with major label Capitol Records. Their third full-length, Our Love to Admire, was released worldwide in 2007, and brought the band chart-topping success in Ireland. Lead single "The Heinrich Maneuver" became the band's highest and longest charting single in their home nation, spending nineteen weeks in the Billboard Alternative Songs chart, peaking at number eleven. The band's self-titled fourth album Interpol was released in 2010, with the record peaking at number one on the Billboard Independent Albums chart. Interpol was the last album featuring Dengler, who left the band in May 2010.

As of 2014, the band has sold over 1.4 million albums in the United States, and almost two million collectively worldwide.

Albums

Studio albums

Remix albums

Extended plays

Singles

Promotional singles

Other charting songs

Music videos

Other appearances
Listed are songs that were not released by Interpol as stand-alone singles or on studio albums, or released prior to any Interpol release.

Notes

References

General
 
 
 
Specific

External links

Discographies of American artists
Rock music group discographies